Ophelia is the second studio album by the American singer-songwriter Natalie Merchant, released on May 19, 1998, by Elektra Records. The album was supported by the singles "Kind & Generous" and "Break Your Heart", with the former being the most successful single of the album, reaching the top 20 of the Billboard Hot 100 Airplay Chart. "Break Your Heart" also received single and video treatment. These and the other videos from the album, plus three from Tigerlily, were gathered on a Warner Music Vision home video, also entitled Ophelia. "I love the opportunity to flex my thespian muscle," Merchant quips on it. The album became Merchant's only top ten hit on the Billboard 200, where it peaked at number eight.

Track listing
All songs were written by Natalie Merchant.
"Ophelia" – 5:10
"Life is Sweet" – 5:12
"Kind & Generous" – 4:07
"Frozen Charlotte" (with Karen Peris of The Innocence Mission) – 5:23
"My Skin" – 5:30
"Break Your Heart" (with N'Dea Davenport) – 4:47
"King of May" – 4:09
"Thick as Thieves" – 6:57
"Effigy" – 2:30
"The Living" – 3:18
"When They Ring the Golden Bells (with Karen Peris of The Innocence Mission) / Ophelia (Reprise)" (string arrangement by Gavin Bryars) – 9:33

Personnel 
 Natalie Merchant – vocals, Wurlitzer electric piano (4, 9), acoustic piano (5, 10), Hammond organ (9)
 George Laks – acoustic piano (1, 2), organ (1), Wurlitzer electric piano (3), Hammond organ (3, 7), Rhodes piano (7)
 Ken Appollo – barrel organ (1)
 Todd Vos – electric guitar (1)
 Craig Ross – electric guitar (2, 3, 6), acoustic guitar (2, 5, 7)
 Lokua Kanza – acoustic guitar (3, 6)
 Don Peris – electric guitar (4, 11)
 Donnie Ward – electric guitar (6)
 Daniel Lanois – electric guitar (8)
 Karen Peris – vocals (4, 11), acoustic guitar (11)
 Graham Maby – bass (2, 3, 4, 6, 7, 8, 10, 11)
 Jay Brunga – acoustic bass (5)
 Peter Yanowitz – drums (1-8, 10, 11)
 Joakim Lartey – percussion (3)
 Michelle Kinney – cello (1, 5, 8)
 Karl Berger – string arrangements andconducto (2, 6, 7)
 Garo Yellin – cello (2, 6, 7)
 Ralph Farris – viola (2, 6, 7)
 Conway Kuo – viola (2, 6, 7)
 Hector Falcon – violin (2, 6, 7)
 Krystof Witek – violin (2, 6, 7)
 Tom Varner – French horn (2)
 Chris Botti – trumpet (6)
 N'Dea Davenport – vocals (6)
 Yungchen Lhamo – vocals (9), Tibetan translation (9)

Credits for "Ophelia" and "Ophelia (Reprise)"
 Camille Labro – French voice (1)
 Susanna Schmitz – German voice (1)
 Carmen Consoli – Italian voice (1)
 Bella Urina – Russian voice (1)
 Rocio Paez – Spanish voice (1)
 Christopher Wilson – theorbo (11.3)
 Pamela Thorby – recorder (11.3)
 William Hunt – string bass (11.3)
 Susanna Pell – bass viol (11.3)
 Richard Campbell – tenor viol (11.3)
 Julia Hodgson – tenor viol (11.3)
 Wendy Gillespie – treble viol (11.3)

Production 
 Todd Vos – engineer (1-7, 10, 11.1)
 John Holbrook – engineer (8, 9)
 Rupert Coulson – engineer (11.3)
 Ricky Graham – assistant engineer (11.3)
 Jim Scott – mixing 
 Mike Scotella – mix assistant 
 Bob Ludwig – mastering at Gateway Mastering (Portland, Maine)
 Helene Silverman – package design 
 Mark Seliger – photography 
 Cynthia Rowley – costume designs

Charts

Weekly charts

Year-end charts

Certifications

Notes

1998 albums
Natalie Merchant albums
Elektra Records albums
Concept albums